Jacques Galipeau (22 September 1923 – 30 August 2020) was a Canadian actor.

Filmography
Beau temps, mauvais temps (1955)
Le Survenant (1957)
Marie-Didace (1958)
Filles d'Ève (1960)
Ti-Jean Caribou (1963)
Le Paradis terrestre (1968)
Les Belles Histoires des pays d'en haut (1969)
Mont-Joye (1970)
Le Temps des Lilas (1971)
Tang (1971)
Le Fils du ciel (1972)
The Pyx (1973)
La Petite Patrie (1974)
Bingo (1974)
Duplessis (1977)
Le Clan Beaulieu (1978)
Ça peut pas être l'hiver, on n'a même pas eu d'été (1980)
Laurier (1984)
He Shoots, He Scores (1991)
Marilyn (1991)
Les Grands Procès (1993)
Black List (1995)
Set Me Free (1999)
Chaos and Desire (2002)

Theatre
Les Fous de Dieu (1952)

References

External links

1923 births
2020 deaths
Canadian male television actors
French Quebecers
Male actors from Montreal
20th-century Canadian male actors